"At North Farm" is a poem by American poet and writer John Ashbery.

History and writing
The poem first appeared in The New Yorker in 1984. It was the opening poem of Ashbery's 1984 collection A Wave. It was written soon after Ashbery almost died due to an infection. 

The poem is in part a reference to the epic poem Kalevala, which Ashbery revisited in his later poem "Finnish Rhapsody".

Content

Composition
The poem loosely adheres to the form of a sonnet, with the traditional fourteen lines and the octet/seste of a Petrarchan sonnet. Adhering to the format was not intentional on Ashbery's part.

Themes
In her review of A Wave, Helen Vendler wrote that the poem deals with the pains of aging using clichés.

Allusions and influences
The poem is evocative of W. H. Auden's work. Auden had an influence on Ashbery early poetry, an influence that diminished over the course of his career.

Reception
Although shorter and simpler than many of his most famous works, it is considered to be a well-known poem of Ashbery's.

External links
 At North Farm

References

1984 poems
Poetry by John Ashbery